The 1928 Bristol West by-election was held on 2 February 1928.  The by-election was held due to the elevation to the peerage of the incumbent Conservative MP, George Gibbs.  It was won by the Conservative candidate Cyril Culverwell.

Candidates
The local Liberal association selected William Nichols Marcy as their candidate. Marcy was a schoolmaster who had worked in America. He had previously been a member of the Unionist Party but left them in 1924. He was standing for parliament for the first time.

Result

References

1928 in England
1928 elections in the United Kingdom
West, 1928
20th century in Bristol